Thomas de Vere, 8th Earl of Oxford (c. 1336 – September 1371) was the second son of John de Vere, 7th Earl of Oxford, and Maud de Badlesmere. He was predeceased by his elder brother, Sir John Vere of Whitchurch, Buckinghamshire, who married Elizabeth de Courtenay, the daughter of Hugh de Courtenay, 10th Earl of Devon, and died before 23 June 1350 without issue.

Thomas took part in several of the military campaigns of Edward III. He married, sometime before 10 June 1350, Maud de Ufford, daughter and heir of Sir Ralph de Ufford and Maud of Lancaster, the daughter of Henry of Lancaster, grandson of King Henry III. After Thomas's death, his widow was indicted for involvement in a plot against King Henry IV, but was later pardoned. When Thomas died in 1371, he was succeeded by his only son, Robert de Vere, 9th Earl of Oxford.

Footnotes

References

 

1330s births
1371 deaths
Year of birth uncertain
Thomas de Vere, 8th Earl
Thomas
14th-century English people